Scouting in South Australia began in 1908.

In the early years of Scouting in South Australia, local Boy Scout patrols and troops formed independently and there were several separate central organisations including Boys' Brigade Scouts, Church Lads Brigade Scouts, Chums Scouts, British Boy Scouts, The Boy Scouts Association, Life-Saving Scouts of the Salvation Army and Methodist Boy Scouts.

Scouting in South Australia is now predominantly represented by Scouts Australia's South Australian Branch and the Girl Guides South Australia, a member organisation of Girl Guides Australia. There is representation by ethnic scout associations, some of which form the Ethnic Scouts and Guides of South Australia (ESGOSA) and, since 1984, representation by the Baden-Powell Scouts' Association.

Scouts Australia South Australian Branch

Scouts Australia's South Australian Branch has 11 districts - Adelaide Foothills, Beadell, Heysen, Hills to Coast, Karkana, Limestone Coast, Mawson, Ridley, Three Rivers and Torrens. There are also Lone Scouts for youth too far away from a regular meeting place.

Facilities
Woodhouse Activity Centre, Piccadilly - site of numerous Australian Scout Jamborees
Roonka Water Activity Centre - near Blanchetown, South Australia
Armstrong Air Activities Centre - near Blanchetown, South Australia
Glenelg Activities Centre
Napperby Scout Camp, - Near Port Pirie
 Nyroca Campsite and Function Centre - Near Port Lincoln
 Seahaven, Outer Harbor

Titanium Security Arena
Since 3 April 2013, Scouts SA has been co-owner (along with SA Church Basketball) of the 8,000 seat Titanium Security Arena.

Rovering
As of August 2020, there are 14 Rover Units (previously called Crews) in South Australia which run programs at the Unit and Branch level.

Girl Guides Australia
Girl Guides SA operates three accommodation sites in South Australia, GTS Dolphin beachfront accommodation in Port Adelaide, Douglas Scrub campsite near McLaren Flat, and Tuckerway Hostel.

Gang Shows and other theatrical experiences
There are a number of Gang Shows put on in South Australia. A Gang Show is a Scout variety show.

 Adelaide Gang Show - started in 1961.
 Comedy Capers Gang Show - started in 1965, located in Northern Adelaide.
  Scouts Shouts Youth Theatre - started in 1973, located in Salisbury, South Australia.
 Carry On Guides - the only known all-Guide show worldwide, started in 1973, located in Northern Adelaide.

References

External links

South Australia Scouts
Armstrong Airfield Scout Air Activities Centre
Joey Scouts SA
Cub Scouts SA
Scouts SA
Venturer Scouts SA
SA Rovers
SA Lones
Scouts SA purchase Adelaide Arena

South Australia, Scouting in